FS class E.420 locomotive was a third rail electric locomotive built for the operation of the Milan - Gallarate - Varese railway in Italy.

History

The locomotive was ordered for the operation of the Milan - Gallarate - Varese railway line, electrified in 1901 by the Rete Mediterranea (RM). It was registered by the RM as RM.01 and was used for both passenger and freight traffic. In addition, twenty railcars were ordered.

In 1905 the locomotive was taken over by the Ferrovie dello Stato (FS). In the late 1920s, the locomotive was transferred from the Varese line to the Naples subway, to be used for freight traffic from Naples Campi Flegrei station. With the electrification at 3000 V DC of the Neapolitan line in 1937, it was transferred to the Cumana railway, which had been electrified in 1927. Here, it was converted to the 1200 V DC overhead line system and fitted with a pantograph. It remained in service until 1963.

Technical details

The locomotive was built by General Electric and was similar to machines already in operation in the United States and Europe. In particular, it was similar to the E1-E8 series supplied to the French Compagnie du chemin de fer de Paris à Orléans and exhibited at the Exposition Universelle (1900) in Paris. The four traction motors totalled 440 kW, identical to that of the railcars delivered at the same time. At the maximum speed of 60 km/h, the locomotive could haul a train of eight four-wheel coaches. In appearance, the E.420 resembled the locomotives delivered to the Paris-Orléans railway, known as "salt boxes".

References

Further reading
    Francesco Ogliari, Giovanni Cornolò, Si viaggia... anche così, Arcipelago Edizioni, Milano, 2002, .
    Eduardo Bevere, Gerardo Chiaro, Andrea Cozzolino, Storia dei trasporti urbani di Napoli e delle linee interurbane gestite dalla SATN, dalle Tramvie di Capodimonte e dalle aziende municipalizzate. Volume secondo - il materiale rotabile, Calosci, Cortona (AR), 1999, .

E.420
650 V DC locomotives
Bo′Bo′ locomotives
Railway locomotives introduced in 1901
Standard gauge locomotives of Italy